Royal Adelaide may refer to:
 Royal Adelaide Hospital, a hospital in Adelaide, South Australia
 Royal Adelaide Show, an agricultural show in Adelaide, South Australia
 Royal Adelaide Golf Club, a golf club in Adelaide, South Australia

Ships 
 , a 104-gun first-rate ship of the line of the Royal Navy
 Royal Adelaide (1834), a miniature frigate built by William IV and dismantled in 1877
 , a paddle steamer sunk off Kent in 1850
 Royal Adelaide (1865), an iron sailing ship sunk in Lyme Bay in 1872